PS Sea Nymph was a paddle steamer passenger vessel operated by the London and North Western Railway from 1856 to 1876.

History

She was built by Caird & Company of Greenock for the North West of Ireland Union Steam Company and launched on 22 March 1845. Twenty-one people were killed and Sea Nymph was severely damaged. In 1854, she was sold to the Belfast Steamship Company, and in 1856 passed to the Chester and Holyhead Railway, whose ships were taken over by the London and North Western Railway in 1859. She was sold to W E Clayton, Birkenhead in 1875.

She was scrapped in Birkenhead in 1876.

References

1845 ships
Passenger ships of the United Kingdom
Ships built on the River Clyde
Ships of the London and North Western Railway
Paddle steamers of the United Kingdom
Maritime incidents in May 1846